Samuel James Leitch (1927–1980) was a British journalist and television sports presenter.  He came from a Scottish family but was born in Great Yarmouth in Norfolk, England.

He was the editor of Match of the Day at the BBC for some years.  For several years up to 1974 he presented the "Football Preview" slot on Grandstand on a Saturday, previewing the day's matches. This was later to evolve into Football Focus.

Although the error has been attributed to commentators David Coleman or Frank Bough, it was Leitch who, when the Scottish football team Raith Rovers won a match, said "They'll be dancing in the streets of Raith tonight". This was seen as a display of ignorance since Raith Rovers play in the town of Kirkcaldy.

Leitch died from a heart attack in London in 1980 at the age of 53.

References

British television personalities
1927 births
1980 deaths